Corsica (Upper , Southern ;  ;) is an island in the Mediterranean Sea and one of the 18 regions of France. It is the fourth-largest island in the Mediterranean and lies southeast of the French mainland, west of the Italian Peninsula and immediately north of the Italian island of Sardinia, which is the land mass nearest to it. A single chain of mountains makes up two-thirds of the island. , it had a population of 351,255.

The island is a territorial collectivity of France. The regional capital is Ajaccio. Although the region is divided into two administrative departments, Haute-Corse and Corse-du-Sud, their respective regional and departmental territorial collectivities were merged on 1 January 2018 to form the single territorial collectivity of Corsica. As such, Corsica enjoys a greater degree of autonomy than other French regional collectivities; for example, the Corsican Assembly is permitted to exercise limited executive powers. Corsica's second-largest town is Bastia, the prefecture of Haute-Corse.

Corsica was ruled by the Republic of Genoa from 1284 to 1755, when it seceded to become a self-proclaimed, Italian-speaking Republic. In 1768, Genoa officially ceded it to Louis XV of France as part of a pledge for the debts it had incurred by enlisting France's military help in suppressing the Corsican revolt, and as a result France went on to annex it in 1769. The future Emperor of the French, Napoleon Bonaparte, was a native Corsican, born that same year in Ajaccio: his ancestral home, Maison Bonaparte, is today a visitor attraction and museum. Because of Corsica's historical ties to Tuscany, the island has retained many Italian cultural elements and many Corsican surnames are rooted in the Italian peninsula. Corsican, the native tongue, is recognised as one of France's regional languages. Corsica is the least populated region of metropolitan France, and the third–least populated overall after Mayotte and French Guiana.

History

Prehistory and antiquity

The origin of the name Corsica is subject to much debate and remains a mystery. To the Ancient Greeks it was known as Kalliste, Corsis, Cyrnos, Cernealis, or Cirné. The last three variations derive from the most ancient Greek name of the island, "" ("Sirenusse", meaning of the Sirens) — the very same Sirens mentioned in Homer's Odyssey.

Corsica has been occupied since the Mesolithic era. The permanent human presence in Corsica is documented in the Neolithic period from the 6th millennium BC. In the 2nd millennium BC Corsica, the southern part in particular, saw the rise of the Torrean civilization, strongly linked to the Nuragic civilization in Sardinia.

After a brief occupation by the Carthaginians, colonization by the ancient Greeks, and an only slightly longer occupation by the Etruscans, it was incorporated by the Roman Republic at the end of the First Punic War and, with Sardinia, in 238 BC became a province of the Roman Republic. The Romans, who built a colony in Aléria, considered Corsica as one of the most backward regions of the Roman world. The island produced sheep, honey, resin and wax, and exported many slaves, not well considered because of their fierce and rebellious character. Moreover, it was known for its cheap wines, exported to Rome, and was used as a place of relegation, one of the most famous exiles being the Roman philosopher Seneca. Administratively, the island was divided into pagi, which in the Middle Ages became the pievi, the basic administrative units of the island until 1768. During the diffusion of Christianity, which arrived quite early from Rome and the Tuscan harbors, Corsica was home to many martyrs and saints: among them, the most important are Saint Devota and Saint Julia, both patrons of the island. Corsica was integrated into Roman Italy by Emperor Diocletian.

Middle Ages and early-modern era

In the fifth century, the western half of the Roman Empire collapsed, and the island was invaded by the Vandals and the Ostrogoths. Briefly recovered by the Byzantines, it soon became part of the Kingdom of the Lombards. This made it a dependency of the March of Tuscany, which used it as an outpost against the Saracens. Pepin the Short, king of the Franks and Charlemagne's father, expelled the Lombards and nominally granted Corsica to Pope Stephen II. In the first quarter of the 11th century, Pisa and Genoa together freed the island from the threat of Arab invasion. After that, the island came under the influence of the republic of Pisa. Many polychrome churches which adorn the island date from this period. Corsica also experienced a massive immigration from Tuscany, which gave to the island its present toponymy and rendered the language spoken in the northern two-thirds of the island very close to the Tuscan dialect. This led to the traditional division of Corsica into two parts, along the main chain of mountains roughly going from Calvi to Porto-Vecchio: the eastern Banda di dentro, or Cismonte, more populated, developed, and open to the commerce with Italy, and the western Banda di fuori, or Pomonte, almost deserted, wild and remote.

The crushing defeat experienced by Pisa in 1284 in the Battle of Meloria against Genoa had among its consequences the end of the Pisan rule and the beginning of the Genoese influence in Corsica: this was contested initially by the King of Aragon, who in 1296 had received from the Pope the investiture over Sardinia and Corsica. A popular revolution against this and the feudal lords, led by Sambucuccio d'Alando, got the aid of Genoa. After that, the Cismonte was ruled as a league of comuni and churches, after the Italian experience. The following 150 years were a period of conflict, when the Genoese rule was contested by Aragon, the local lords, the comuni and the Pope: finally, in 1450 Genoa ceded the administration of the island to its main bank, the Bank of Saint George, which brought peace.

In the 16th century, the island entered into the fight between Spain and France for supremacy in Italy.  In 1553, a Franco-Ottoman fleet occupied Corsica, but the reaction of Spain and Genoa, led by Andrea Doria, reestablished the Genoese supremacy on the island, confirmed by the Peace of Cateau-Cambresis. The unlucky protagonist of this episode was Sampiero di Bastelica, who would later come to be considered a hero of the island. Their power was reinstated, the Genoese did not allow the Corsican nobility to share in the government of the island and oppressed the inhabitants with a heavy tax burden. On the other hand, they introduced the chestnut tree on a large scale, improving the diet of the population, and built a chain of towers along the coast to defend Corsica from the attacks of the Barbary pirates from North Africa. The period of peace lasted until 1729, when the refusal to pay taxes by a peasant sparked the general insurrection of the island against Genoa.

The island became known for the large number of mercenary soldiers and officers it produced. In 1743, over 4,600 Corsicans, or 4% of the entire population of the island, were serving as soldiers in various armies (predominantly those of Genoa, Venice, and Spain), making it one of the most militarized societies in Europe.

Rise and annexation of the Corsican Republic

In 1729 the Corsican Revolution for independence from Genoa began, first led by Luiggi Giafferi and Giacinto Paoli, and later by Paoli's son, Pasquale Paoli. After 26 years of struggle against the Republic of Genoa, including an ephemeral attempt in 1736 to proclaim an independent Kingdom of Corsica under the German adventurer Theodor von Neuhoff, an independent Corsican Republic was proclaimed in 1755 under the leadership of Pasquale Paoli and remained sovereign until 1769 when the island was conquered by France. The first Corsican Constitution was written in Italian, the prevalent language in Corsica until the mid-19th century, by Paoli.

The Corsican Republic was unable to eject the Genoese from the major coastal fortresses of Calvi and Bonifacio. After the Corsican conquest of Capraia in 1767, the Republic of Genoa sold the island to France, as France was trying to reinforce its Mediterranean position after its defeat in the Seven Years' War. In 1768, as part of the Treaty of Versailles, Genoa conceded the region to France to repay its heavy debts. French troops became stationed at forts to try to subdue the republicans. After an initial successful resistance culminating with the victory at Borgo, the Corsican republic was crushed by a large French army led by the Count of Vaux at the Battle of Ponte Novu. This marked the end of Corsican sovereignty. Despite triggering the Corsican Crisis in Britain, whose government gave secret aid, no foreign military support came for the Corsicans. However, nationalist feelings still ran high. Despite the conquest, Corsica was not incorporated into the French state until 1789.

Following the outbreak of the French Revolution in 1789, Pasquale Paoli was able to return to Corsica from exile in Britain. In 1794, he invited British forces under Lord Hood to intervene to free Corsica from French rule. Anglo-Corsican forces drove the French from the island and established an Anglo-Corsican Kingdom. Following Spain's entry into the war, the British decided to withdraw from Corsica in 1796. Corsica returned to French rule.

19th century
 
Despite being the birthplace of the Emperor, who had supported Paoli in his youth, the island was neglected by Napoleon's government. In 1814, near the end of the Napoleonic Wars, Corsica was briefly occupied again by British troops. The Treaty of Bastia gave the British crown sovereignty over the island, but it was later repudiated by Lord Castlereagh who insisted that the island should be returned to a restored French monarchy.

After the restoration, the island was further neglected by the French state. Despite the presence of a middle class in Bastia and Ajaccio, Corsica remained an otherwise primitive place, whose economy consisted mainly of subsistence agriculture, and whose population constituted a pastoral society, dominated by clans and the rules of vendetta. The code of vendetta required Corsicans to seek deadly revenge for offences against their family's honor. Between 1821 and 1852, no fewer than 4,300 murders were perpetrated in Corsica. During the first half of the century, the people of Corsica were still immersed in the Italian cultural world: the bourgeoisie sent children to Pisa to study, official acts were enacted in Italian and most books were printed in Italian. Moreover, many islanders sympathised with the national struggle which was taking place in nearby Italy in those years: several political refugees from the peninsula, like Niccolò Tommaseo, spent years in the island, while some Corsicans, like Count , [it], took active part in the fights for Italian independence.

Despite all that, during those years the Corsicans began to feel a stronger and stronger attachment to France. The reasons for that are manifold: the knowledge of the French language, which thanks to the mandatory primary school started to penetrate among the local youth, the high prestige of French culture, the awareness of being part of a big, powerful state, the possibility of well-paid jobs as civil servants, both in the island, in the mainland and in the colonies, the prospect of serving the French army during the wars for the conquest of the colonial empire, the introduction of steamboats, which reduced the travel time between mainland France from the island drastically, and — last but not least — Napoleon himself, whose existence alone constituted an indissoluble link between France and Corsica. Thanks to all these factors by around 1870 Corsica had landed in the French cultural world.

From the 19th century into the mid-20th century, Corsicans also grew closer to the French nation through participation in the French Empire. Compared to much of Metropolitan France, Corsica was poor and many Corsicans emigrated. While Corsicans emigrated globally, especially to many South American countries, many chose to move within the French Empire which acted as a conduit for emigration and eventual return, as many young Corsican men could find better job opportunities in the far corners of the Empire where many other French hesitated to go. In many parts of the Empire, Corsicans were strongly represented, such as in Saigon where in 1926 12% of Europeans were from Corsica. Across the French Empire, many Corsicans retained a sense of community by establishing organizations where they would meet regularly, keep one another informed of developments in Corsica, and come to one another's aid in times of need.

Modern Corsica

Corsica paid a high price for the French victory in the First World War: agriculture was disrupted by the years-long absence of almost all of the young workers, and the percentage of dead or wounded Corsicans in the conflict was double that of those from mainland France. Moreover, the protectionist policies of the French government, started in the 1880s and never stopped, had ruined the Corsican export of wine and olive oil, and forced many young Corsicans to emigrate to mainland France or to the Americas. In reaction to these conditions, a nationalist movement was born in the 1920s around the newspaper A Muvra, having as its objective the autonomy of the island from France. In the 1930s, many exponents of this movement became irredentist, seeing annexation of the island to fascist Italy as the only solution to its problems. Under Benito Mussolini annexation of Corsica had become one of the main goals of Italy's unification policy.

After the collapse of France to the German Wehrmacht in 1940, Corsica came under the rule of the Vichy French regime, which was collaborating with Nazi Germany. In November 1942 the island was occupied by Italian and German forces following the Anglo-American landings in North Africa. After the Italian armistice in September 1943, Italian and Free French Forces pushed the Germans out of the island, making Corsica the first French Department to be freed. Subsequently, the US military established 17 airfields, nicknamed "USS Corsica", which served as bases for attacks on targets in German-occupied Italy.

The Corsicans who promoted the ideal of Corsican irredentism published mainly in Italy, because of the persecutions from the French regime in the island in the first half of the 20th century. Many Corsicans, notably Petru Giovacchini, Simon Petru Cristofini and Marco Angeli di Sartèna, supported Italian irredentism on the island. Cristofini was executed by the French authorities; Angeli and Giovacchini were also condemned to death, but they escaped in Italy.

During the May 1958 crisis, the French military command in Algeria mutinied against the French Fourth Republic and on 24 May occupied the island in an action called Opération Corse that led to the collapse of the government; the second phase of the coup attempt, occupying Paris, was cancelled following the establishment of a transitional government under Charles de Gaulle.

Between the late fifties and the seventies, proposals to conduct underground nuclear tests in the Argentella mines, the immigration of 18,000 former settlers from Algeria ("Pieds-Noirs") in the eastern plains, and continuing chemical pollution (Fanghi Rossi) from mainland Italy increased tensions between the indigenous inhabitants and the French government. Tensions escalated until an armed police assault on a pieds-noirs-owned wine cellar in Aleria, occupied by Corsican nationalists on 23 August 1975. This marked the beginning of the Corsican conflict, an armed nationalist struggle against the French government. Ever since, Corsican nationalism has been a feature of the island's politics, with calls for greater autonomy and protection for Corsican culture and the Corsican language, or even full independence. Some groups supporting independence, such as the National Liberation Front of Corsica, have carried out a violent campaign that includes bombings and assassinations targeting buildings and officials representing the French government; periodic flare-ups of raids and killings culminated in the assassination of Prefect Claude Érignac in 1998. Lately, the drive towards independence has taken a more electoral approach, where Corsicans elected pro-autonomist, or pro-independence parties overwhelmingly in the past few elections.

In 2013, Corsica hosted the first three stages of the 100th Tour de France, which passed through the island for the first time in the event's 110-year history.

In 2018 Corsica had the highest murder rate in France which were the result of family feuds between clans on the island and vendettas or revenge actions against insults against the honor of a family. The most common victims of gun murders are prominent business people and local mayors.

In March 2022, Corsica saw large protests and riots after Yvan Colonna, the murderer of Claude Érignac, was murdered in prison.

In August 2022, a rare and powerful derecho swept across the island and killed six people, injured dozens of others, and caused significant damage.

Geography

Corsica was formed about 250 million years ago with the uplift of a granite backbone on the western side. About 50 million years ago sedimentary rock was pressed against this granite, forming the schists of the eastern side. It is the most mountainous island in the Mediterranean, a "mountain in the sea".

It is also the fourth-largest island in the Mediterranean, after Sicily, Sardinia and Cyprus.

Mountains comprise two-thirds of the island, forming a single chain. Forests make up 20% of the island.

Corsica contains the GR20, one of Europe's most notable hiking trails.

Major communities

In 2005 the population of Corsica was settled in approximately 360 communities.

Climate

Under the Köppen climate classification scheme, coastal regions are characterized by a hot-summer Mediterranean climate (Csa). Further inland, a warm-summer Mediterranean climate (Csb) is more common. At the highest elevation locations, small areas with a subarctic climate (Dsc, Dfc) and the rare cold-summer Mediterranean climate (Csc) can be found.

The station of Sari-Solenzara records the highest year-round temperatures of Metropolitan France with an annual average of 16.41 °C over the 1981–2010 period. Sunshine hours are not available for same period but this was 2715 h for 2008–2016.

Ecology

Zones by altitude
The island is divided into four major ecological zones, by altitude. Below  is the coastal zone's mild Mediterranean climate, with hot, dry summers and cool, rainy winters. The area's natural vegetation is sparse Mediterranean forest, scrubland, and shrubs. The coastal lowlands are part of the Tyrrhenian-Adriatic sclerophyllous and mixed forests ecoregion, in which forests and woodlands of evergreen sclerophyll oaks predominate, chiefly holm oak (Quercus ilex) and cork oak (Quercus suber). Unfortunately, much of the coastal lowlands have been cleared for agriculture, grazing and logging; these activities have reduced the forest area considerably.

Between  is a temperate montane zone. The mountains are cooler and wetter, and home to the Corsican montane broadleaf and mixed forests ecoregion. This region supports diverse forests of oak, pine, and broadleaf deciduous trees, with vegetation more typical of northern Europe.

The elevation above  is the high alpine zone. Vegetation is sparse, with high winds and frequent cloud cover. This zone is uninhabited.

There is considerable birdlife in Corsica. One famous example is the bearded vulture, or Lammergeier, which (along with the iconic griffon vulture) serve as environmental "janitors" by scavenging the remains of deceased animals, thus limiting the proliferation of infectious microbes and diseases. Other avian species  to be seen include the barn owl, blue rock thrush, common crane,  Corsican nuthatch, golden eagle, greater flamingo, osprey, peregrine falcon, red kite, and starry bittern. In some cases, Corsica is an isolated portion of a species' distribution; in other cases, it is the furthest point in a species' range. For example, a subspecies of hooded crow (Corvus cornix cornix) occurs in Corsica, but not anywhere further south.

Corsica has abundant reptile and amphibians, one protected species being the sensitive Hermann's tortoise, which are found at A Cupulatta at Vero and Moltifao Regional Natural Park. Corsican brook and fire salamanders, leaf-toed gecko, and yellow and green grass snakes are also common. The European pond turtle can be seen, especially in the waters of Fango Estuary, southern Calvi, Biguglia Lagoon and Pietracorbara.

Parc Naturel Régional de Corse
The island has a natural park (Parc Naturel Régional de Corse, Parcu di Corsica), which protects rare animal and plant species. The Park was created in 1972 and includes the Golfe de Porto, the Scandola Nature Reserve (a UNESCO World Heritage Site), and some of the highest mountains on the island. Scandola cannot be reached on foot, but people can gain access by boat from the village of Galéria and Porto (Ota). Two endangered subspecies of hoofed mammals, the European mouflon (Ovis aries musimon) and Corsican red deer (Cervus elaphus corsicanus) inhabit the park. The Corsican red deer was re-introduced after it was extinct due to over hunting. This Corsican subspecies was the same that survived on Sardinia, so it is endemic. There are other species endemic to Corsica especially in the upper mountain ranges, i.e. Corsican nuthatch, Corsican fire salamander and Corsican brook salamander and many plant subspecies.

Extinct animals
Corsica, like all the other Mediterranean islands, was home to endemic mammals during the Late Pleistocene, most or all of these are shared with Sardinia (as Sardinia was joined to Corsica for much of the Pleistocene). After the arrival humans during Mesolithic around 8000 BC, these began to disappear. Some of the smaller mammals managed to survive until at least to the early Iron Age, but all are now extinct.

Extinct mammals formerly native to Corsica include the Sardinian dhole, the mustelid Enhydrictis galictoides, the deer Praemegaceros cazioti, the Corsican giant shrew, Tyrrhenian mole, Sardinian pika, Tyrrhenian vole, and the Tyrrhenian field rat.

Demographics 

Corsica has a population of 351,255 inhabitants (January 2023 estimate).

Immigration
At the 2019 census, 55.7% of the inhabitants of Corsica were people born on the island, 29.9% were from Continental France, 0.3% were natives of Overseas France, and 14.1% were born in foreign countries.

The majority of the foreign immigrants in Corsica come from the Maghreb (particularly Moroccans, who made up 29.0% of all immigrants in Corsica at the 2019 census) and from Southern Europe (particularly Portuguese and Italians, 23.9% and 12.5% of immigrants on the island respectively).

Culture

Languages

French (Français) is the official and most widely spoken language on the island. Italian was the official language of Corsica until 9 May 1859, when it was replaced by French. Corsican (Corsu), a minority language that is closely related to medieval Tuscan (Toscano), has a better prospect of survival than most other French regional languages: Corsican is the second most widely spoken language after French. However, since the annexation of the island by France in the 18th century, Corsican has been under heavy pressure from French, and today it is estimated that only 10% of Corsica's population speak the language natively, with only 50% having some sort of proficiency in it.

The language is divided into two main varieties: Cismuntanu and Ultramuntanu, spoken respectively northeast and southwest of the Girolata–Porto Vecchio line. This division was due to the massive immigration from Tuscany which took place in Corsica during the lower Middle Ages: as a result, the Cismuntanu became very similar to the Tuscan dialects, being part of the Italo-Dalmatian language group, while the Ultramuntanu could keep its original characteristics which make it much more similar to a Southern Romance language like Sardinian (Sardu). Therefore, due to the differences between the main dialectal varieties, many linguists classify Corsican as an Italo-Dalmatian language, while others consider it a Southern Romance one.

Fewer and fewer people speak a Ligurian dialect, known as bunifazzinu, in what has long been a language island, Bonifacio, and in Ajaccio, the aghjaccinu dialect. In Cargèse, a village established by Greek immigrants in the 17th century, Greek (Ελληνικά) was the traditional language: whereas it has long disappeared from spoken conversation, Biblical Greek is still the liturgical language and the village has many Greek Orthodox parishes.

Cuisine

From the mountains to the plains and sea, many ingredients play a role. Game such as wild boar (Cingale, Singhjari) is popular. There also is seafood and river fish such as trout. Delicacies such as figatellu (also named as ficateddu), made with liver, coppa, ham (prizuttu), lonzu are made from Corsican pork (porcu nustrale). Characteristic among the cheeses is brocciu (similar to ricotta), which is used as a fresh ingredient in many dishes, from first courses (sturzapreti) to cakes (fiadone). Other cheeses, like casgiu merzu ("rotten cheese", the Corsican counterpart of the Sardinian casu martzu), casgiu veghju are made from goat or sheep milk. Chestnuts are the main ingredient in the making of pulenta castagnina and cakes (falculelle). A variety of alcohol also exists ranging from aquavita (brandy), red and white Corsican wines (Vinu Corsu), muscat wine (plain or sparkling), and the famous "Cap Corse" apéritif produced by Mattei. The herbs which are part of Maquis and the chestnuts and oak nuts of the Corsican forests are eaten by local animals, resulting in a noticeable flavour in the food there.

Art

Corsica has produced a number of known artists: 
 Alizée (singer/dancer)
 Martha Angelici (opera singer)
 A Filetta (polyphonic chant group)
 Canta U Populu Corsu (band)
 Laetitia Casta (model/actress)
 Baptiste Giabiconi (model/singer)
 Julien de Casabianca (cineast)
 Jérôme Ferrari (writer)
 Patrick Fiori (singer)
 Petru Guelfucci (singer)
 José Luccioni (opera singer)
 Gaston Micheletti (opera singer)
 I Muvrini (band)
 Jenifer (singer)
 François Lanzi (painter)
 Ange Leccia (visual art)
 Henri Padovani (musician; original guitarist for The Police)
 Thierry de Peretti (cineast)
 Marie-Claude Pietragalla (dancer)
 Jean-Paul Poletti (singer)
 Robin Renucci (comedian)
 Tino Rossi (singer)
 César Vezzani (opera singer)

Sport
Most Corsican football clubs are currently littered through the first, second, third, fourth and fifth tiers of French football. AC Ajaccio are the highest ranking team, competing in Ligue 1 after promotion in the 2021–22 season, SC Bastia currently play in Ligue 2 FC Bastia-Borgo currently competes in the Championnat National and Gazélec Ajaccio currently competes in the Championnat National 3. ÉF Bastia previously competed in Regional 1, but in 2021 merged with fellow Corsican team Association de la Jeunesse de Biguglia, to form Football Jeunesse Étoile Biguglia. Tour de Corse is a rally held since 1956, which was a round of the World Rally Championship from 1973 to 2008 and later the Intercontinental Rally Challenge and European Rally Championship. The Tour de Corse returned as a World Rally Championship round in 2015.

Music

Administration

Before 1975, Corsica was a départment of the French region of Provence-Alpes-Côte d'Azur. In 1975 two new départements, Haute-Corse and Corse-du-Sud, were created by splitting the hitherto united departement of Corsica.

On 2 March 1982, a law was passed that gave Corsica the status of territorial collectivity (collectivité territoriale), abolishing the Corsican Regional Council. Unlike the regional councils, the Corsican Assembly has executive powers over the island.

In 1992, three institutions were formed in the territorial collectivity of Corsica:
 The Executive Council of Corsica, which the type of executive functions held in other French regions by the presidents of the Regional Councils. It ensures the stability and consistency needed to manage the affairs of the territory
 The Corsican Assembly, a deliberative, unicameral legislative body with greater powers than the regional councils on the mainland
 The Economic, Social and Cultural Council of Corsica, an advisory body

A local referendum held in 2003, aimed at abolishing the two départements to leave a territorial collectivity with extended powers, was voted down by a narrow margin. However, the issue of Corsican autonomy and greater powers for the Corsican Assembly continues to hold sway over Corsican politics.

Economy
The Gross domestic product (GDP) of the region was 9.6 billion euros in 2018, accounting for 0.4% of French economic output. GDP per capita adjusted for purchasing power was 25,400 euros or 84% of the EU27 average in the same year. The GDP per employee was 103% of the EU average. 
Tourism plays a big part in the Corsican economy. The island's climate, mountains, and coastlines make it popular among tourists. The island has not had the same level of intensive development as other parts of the Mediterranean and is thus mainly unspoiled. Tourism is particularly concentrated in the area around Porto-Vecchio and Bonifacio in the south of the island and Calvi in the northwest.

In 1584 the Genoese governor ordered all farmers and landowners to plant four trees yearly; a chestnut, olive, fig, and mulberry tree. Many communities owe their origin and former richness to the ensuing chestnut woods. Chestnut bread keeps fresh for as long as two weeks. Corsica produces gourmet cheese, wine, sausages, and honey for sale in mainland France and for export. Corsican honey, of which there are six official varieties, is certified as to its origin (Appellation d'origine contrôlée) by the French National Institute of Origin and Quality (Institut National des Appellations d'Origine – INAO).

Corsica's main exports are granite and marble, tannic acid, cork, cheese, wine, citrus fruit, olive oil and cigarettes.

Transport

Airports
Corsica has four international airports: 
 Ajaccio Napoleon Bonaparte Airport 
 Bastia – Poretta Airport 
 Calvi – Sainte-Catherine Airport 
 Figari–Sud Corse Airport (near Bonifacio and Porto Vecchio in the south)

All airports are served by regional French airline Air Corsica, as well as Air France which mainly offers connections to Paris-Orly. Budget carriers such as EasyJet and Ryanair offer seasonal connections to different cities in Europe.

Railway
The island has  of metre gauge railway. The main line runs between Bastia and Ajaccio and there is a branch line from Ponte Leccia to Calvi. Chemins de fer de la Corse (CFC) is the name of the regional rail network serving the French island of Corsica. For a list of stations, see Railway stations in Corsica.

There was also the  along the Tyrrhenian seacoast; that line was heavily damaged during World War II, and subsequently closed for good.

Seaports

Corsica is well connected to the European mainland (Italy and France) by various car ferry lines. The island's busiest seaport is Bastia, which saw more than 2.5 million passengers in 2012. The second busiest seaport is Ajaccio, followed by L'Île-Rousse and Calvi. Propriano and Porto Vecchio in the south also have smaller ferry docks and are seasonally served from France (Marseille), while Bonifacio's harbour is only frequented by smaller car ferries from the neighbouring island of Sardinia.

The ferry companies serving Corsica are Corsica Ferries - Sardinia Ferries (from Savona, Livorno and Piombino in Italy; Toulon and Nice in France), SNCM (from Marseille, Toulon and Nice in France), CMN - La Méridionale (from Marseille in France) and Moby Lines (from Livorno and Genoa in Italy).

Politics

There are several groups and two nationalist parties (the autonomist Femu a Corsica and the separatist Corsica Libera) active on the island calling for some degree of Corsican autonomy from France or even full independence. Generally speaking, regionalist proposals focus on the promotion of the Corsican language, more power for local governments, and some exemptions from national taxes in addition to those already applying to Corsica.

The French government is opposed to full independence but has at times shown support for some level of autonomy. There is support on the island for proposals for greater autonomy, but polls show that a large majority of Corsicans are opposed to full independence.

In 1972, the Italian company Montedison dumped toxic waste off the Corsican coast, creating what looked like red mud in waters around the island with the poisoning of the sea, the most visible effects being cetaceans found dead on the shores. At that time the Corsican people felt that the French government did not support them. To stop the poisoning, one ship carrying toxic waste from Italy was bombed.

Nationalist organisations started to seek money, using tactics similar to those of the Mafia, to fund violence. Some groups that claim to support Corsican independence, such as the National Liberation Front of Corsica, have carried out a violent campaign since the 1970s that includes bombings and assassinations, usually targeting buildings and officials representing the French government or Corsicans themselves for political reasons. A war between two rival independence groups led to several deaths in the 1990s. The peaceful occupation of a pied-noir vineyard in Aléria in 1975 marked a turning point when the French government responded with overwhelming force, generating sympathy for the independence groups among the Corsican population.

In 2000, Prime Minister Lionel Jospin agreed to grant increased autonomy to Corsica. The proposed autonomy for Corsica would have included greater protection for the Corsican language (Corsu), the island's traditional language, whose practice and teaching, like other regional or minority languages in France, had been discouraged in the past. According to the UNESCO classification, the Corsican language is currently in danger of becoming extinct. However, plans for increased autonomy were opposed by the Gaullist opposition in the French National Assembly, who feared that they would lead to calls for autonomy from other régions (such as Brittany, Alsace, or Provence), eventually threatening France's unity as a country.

In a referendum on 6 July 2003, a narrow majority of Corsican voters opposed a proposal by the government of Jean-Pierre Raffarin and then-Interior Minister Nicolas Sarkozy that would have suppressed the two départements of the island and granted greater autonomy to the territorial collectivity of Corsica.

On 13 December 2015, the regionalist coalition Pè a Corsica, supported by both Femu a Corsica and Corsica Libera and led by Gilles Siméoni, won the territorial elections with a percentage of 36.9%.

On 17 December 2015, Jean Guy Talamoni was elected President of the Assembly of Corsica and Gilles Simeoni was elected Executive President of the Council of the Region. In addition, legislation granting Corsica a greater degree of autonomy was passed.

On 16 March 2022, the interior minister, Gérald Darmanin, told regional newspaper Corse Matin before a two-day visit: "We are ready to go as far as autonomy – there you go, the word has been said." The comment came after two weeks of rioting in which 100 people were injured and public buildings and police were attacked with homemade explosive devices.

See also

 Corsican nationalism
 Corsican language
 Italian irredentism in Corsica
 Corsican immigration to Puerto Rico
 Corsican immigration to Venezuela
 Corsican Workers' Trade Union
 Corsican mafia
 "Dio vi salvi Regina", the unofficial Corsican anthem
 GR 20
 List of bodies of water of Corsica
 List of castles in Corsica
 University of Corsica Pascal Paoli

Notes

Bibliography
 
 Loughlin, John. 1989. "Regionalism and Ethnic Nationalism in France: A Case-study of Corsica". Thesis. San Domenico, Italy: European University Institute.
 Loughlin, John, and Claude Olivesi (eds.). 1999. Autonomies insulaires: vers une politique de différence pour la Corse. Ajaccio: Editions Albiana. 
 Ravis-Giordani, Georges. 1991. Le Guide de la Corse. Besançon: La Manufacture. 
 Saul, John Ralston. 1992. Voltaire's Bastards: The Dictatorship of Reason in the West. New York: Free Press; Maxwell Macmillan International.

External links

 Official website
 Corsica: a mountain in the sea – Official French website (in English)
 
 
 
 
 

 
 
 
 
 
 Ferries to Corsica Detailed technical specifications of the various ferry vessels, history, deckplans. 
 Audio recording of the traditional Corsican folktale 'Goldenhair' (in English)
 3-minute video "The Workout the World Forgot," filmed in Corsica, 2008

 
Mediterranean islands
Regions of France
Southern Europe
Islands of the Tyrrhenian Sea
Territories of the Republic of Genoa